On April 28, 1905, William H. Pickering, who had seven years earlier discovered Phoebe, announced the discovery of a tenth satellite of Saturn, which he promptly named Themis after the goddess of divine law and order from Greek mythology. The photographic plates on which it supposedly appeared, thirteen in all, spanned a period between April 17 and July 8, 1904. However, no other astronomer has ever confirmed Pickering's claim. 

Pickering attempted to compute an orbit, which showed a fairly high inclination (39.1° to the ecliptic), fairly large eccentricity (0.23) and a semi-major axis slightly less than that of Hyperion. The period was supposedly 20.85 days, with prograde motion.

Oddly, in April 1861, Hermann Goldschmidt had also believed that he had discovered a new satellite of Saturn between Titan and Hyperion, which he called Chiron. Chiron also does not exist (however, the name was used much later for the comet/asteroid 2060 Chiron).

Pickering was awarded the Lalande Prize of the French Academy of Sciences in 1906 for his "discovery of the ninth and tenth satellites of Saturn".

The actual tenth satellite of Saturn (in order of discovery) was Janus, which was discovered in 1966 and confirmed in 1980. 

There is also an asteroid named 24 Themis.

Themis in fiction
 Philip Latham (pen-name of Robert S. Richardson), in his novel Missing Men of Saturn, has Themis collide with Titan, "getting rid of the little nuisance once and for all", according to the introduction.
 John Varley's science fiction novel Titan is set aboard an expedition to Saturn. As they approach the planet and prepare to enter orbit, the astronomer onboard discovers a new moon. At first she believes she has recovered Pickering's lost moon, so she names it Themis.
 Robert Anton Wilson's Schrödinger's Cat trilogy of novels makes frequent reference to Pickering's Moon as a satellite that revolves the "wrong way" (i. e. retrograde) around its primary.
 Nelson S. Bond, in his 1943 science-fiction story "The Ordeal of Lancelot Biggs," explains that Themis periodically disappears when it is occulted by its own moon, an invisible body with "the peculiar property of being able to warp light waves around itself."

References
 Deguy: Le cosmos revue encyclopedique hebdomadaire des progres des sciences et de leurs applications aux arts et a l'industrie, p.421 (1861)
 Annals of Harvard College Observatory, vol. 53, no. 9, pp. 173-185 (1905)
 Harvard College Observatory Bulletin No. 189, p.1 (April 1905)
 AnHar 53 (1905) 173
 AnHar 61 (1908) 86
 MNRAS 69 (1909) 215
 Obs 28 (1905) 12:433
 Obs 31 (1908) 8:295
 Obs 32 (1909) 3:79
 PASP 18 (1906) 96

See also
 List of hypothetical astronomical objects

Moons of Saturn
Hypothetical moons
Hypothetical bodies of the Solar System